Loosely speaking, a residual is the error in a result. To be precise, suppose we want to find x such that 

 

Given an approximation x0 of x, the residual is 

 

that is, "what is left of the right hand side" after subtracting f(x0)" (thus, the name "residual": what is left, the rest). On the other hand, the error is

 

If the exact value of x is not known, the residual can be computed, whereas the error cannot.

Residual of the approximation of a function
Similar terminology is used dealing with differential, integral and functional equations. For the approximation  of the solution  of the equation

the residual can either be the function
 
or can be said to be the maximum of the norm of this difference
 
over the domain , where the function  is expected to approximate the solution , or some integral of a function of the difference, for example:

 

In many cases, the smallness of the residual means that the approximation is close to the solution, i.e., 

 

In these cases, the initial equation is considered as well-posed; and the residual can be considered as a measure of deviation of the approximation from the exact solution.

Use of residuals

When one does not know the exact solution, one may look for the approximation with small residual.

Residuals appear in many areas in mathematics, including iterative solvers such as the generalized minimal residual method, which seeks solutions to equations by systematically minimizing the residual.

References

Numerical analysis